was an aircraft carrier unit of the Imperial Japanese Navy's First Air Fleet.  At the beginning of the Pacific Campaign of World War II, the Fifth Carrier Division consisted of the fleet carriers Shōkaku and Zuikaku. These two ships participated in the attack on Pearl Harbor, using their aircraft to strafe airfields and provide fighter protection for bombers. On the way back to Japan after Pearl Harbor, the 5th Carrier Division was used to protect the main fleet from American submarines suspected of following the fleet.

Additional campaigns in which the 5th Carrier Division took part included the Battle of the Coral Sea and the Indian Ocean raid of 1942. The division experienced success with its aircraft sinking one British carrier and two British cruisers, as well as the American carrier the USS Lexington. During the Coral Sea battle, Shōkaku was damaged and needed extensive repairs, and both carriers' aviation units took heavy losses, taking the division out of action for several months. As a result, the division was not present at the Battle of Midway.   After the Japanese defeat at Midway, Shōkaku and Zuikaku, along with light carrier Zuihō, were redesignated as the First Carrier Division and the Fifth Carrier Division was permanently dissolved.

Fate
After the 5th was dissolved, Shōkaku and Zuikaku would fight on for several years, but neither would survive the war.  Shōkaku was sunk by the American submarine  during the Battle of the Philippine Sea.  Explosions due to aviation fuel (avgas) accelerated the sinking, and she took over 1,000 men with her. Zuikaku would fight on until the Battle of Leyte Gulf when, as flagship of the Imperial Japanese Navy with Admiral Jisaburo Ozawa on board, she was attacked and sunk by US carrier aircraft, taking 800 men with her, along with the light carrier Zuiho. Ozawa survived and transferred his flag to the light cruiser . By that point in the war, the Japanese Navy was hampered by a lack of fuel and experienced pilots, and thus the battle would be one-sided.

Organization

References

Japanese aircraft carrier Shōkaku, (USA)
The Maru Special, Ushio Shobō (Ushioshobokojinsha Co., Ltd.), Tōkyō, Japan.
Japanese Naval Vessels No. 6, Aircraft carrier Shōkaku, Zuikaku, 1976.
Japanese Naval Vessels No. 12, Special type destroyers III, 1978.
Japanese Naval Vessels No. 38, Japanese aircraft carriers II, 1980.
Japanese Naval Vessels No. 41, Japanese destroyers I, 1980.
Warship Mechanism Vol. 3, Mechanisms of Japanese 29 Aircraft Carriers, 1981.
 Senshi Sōsho, Asagumo Shimbun, Tōkyō, Japan.
 Vol. 91, Combined Fleet #1, "Until outbreak of the war", 1975
 Vol. 80, Combined Fleet #2, "Until June 1942", 1975

5
Units of the Imperial Japanese Navy Air Service
Military units and formations established in 1941
Military units and formations disestablished in 1942